Karimabad (also Romanized as Karīmābād) is a village in Yusefvand Rural District, in the Central District of Selseleh County, Lorestan Province, Iran. At the 2006 census, its population was 40, in 8 families.

References 

Towns and villages in Selseleh County